Quad International, Inc., doing business as The Score Group, is a publishing company based in Miami, Florida that engages in the production and distribution of adult entertainment. Founded in 1991, The Score Group (TSG) publishes several monthly magazines including its flagship publication Score, and several others including Voluptuous, 18eighteen, Naughty Neighbors and Leg Sex. TSG also publishes quarterly magazines including, XL, 40something, 50Plus Milfs, 60Plus Milfs and New Cummers, as well as a mainstream men's magazine Looker. In addition it distributes adult content through its websites which include Scoreland.com, SCOREVideos.com, PornMegaLoad.com, Voluptuous.com, 18eighteen.com, XLgirls.com, LegSex.com, 40SomethingMag.com, 50PlusMilfs.com, 60PlusMilfs.com and NewCummers.com. The publishing company also produces and distributes full-length adult films under its Score Videos label.

Magazines

Score
Score specializes in photographs of women with large breasts, either naturally larger or augmented.

Others
 Voluptuous features busty women who have had no breast augmentations.
 18eighteen: A magazine dedicated to women who are presented as 18 or 19 years old.
 Naughty Neighbors: Nude photos of models present as ordinary "girl next door" types.
 Leg Sex is a magazine dedicated to leg fetishism, and features photos of women's legs.

Quarterly magazines
 Bootylicious features photos primarily of Black and Hispanic women, concentrating on their buttocks (i.e. their "booty").
 XL Girls: A spinoff of Voluptuous which was originally called Voluptuous XL dedicated to very full-figured women, heavier than Voluptuous magazine models. This magazine features heavier women who are generally referred to as BBW, rubenesque, or plumpers.
 40something features photos primarily of older women presented as being in their 40s.
 50Plus Milfs features photos primarily of older women presented as being in their 50s.
 60Plus Milfs features photos primarily of older women presented as being in their 60s.
 New Cummers features models who are claimed to be new to the adult industry.

Award nominations
 2010 XBIZ Award Nominee - Emerging Affiliate Program of the Year

References

External links
 
 

Adult magazine publishing companies
Companies based in Miami
Magazine publishing companies of the United States
Mass media companies of the United States
Pornography in Florida
Publishing companies established in 1991
1991 establishments in Florida